The following is a list of Hannah Montana home video releases. The series has been released to DVD in Regions 1, 2, and 4.

Region 1 (United States and Canada)

Volume releases

Disney's mixed releases

Other releases

Season releases

According to Amazon.com, Seasons 2 and 3 will be released; however, no dates have been announced.

Region 2 (Europe, Turkey, Algeria, Saudi Arabia, Japan, South Africa)

Volume releases

Disney's mixed releases

Other releases

Season releases

Region 4 (Australia, New Zealand, Mexico, Caribbean, and South America)

Volume releases

Disney's mixed releases

Other releases

Season releases

Hannah Montana DVDs are available in New Zealand, but they can only be bought online.

References

Home video releases
Hannah Montana